Nelson Geingob (born 6 April 1982) is a Namibian former footballer. He played for Namibian sides Chief Santos, Black Africa,  Civics Windhoek and Oshakati City as well as for the Namibia national football team.

References

External links

1982 births
Living people
People from Tsumeb
Namibian men's footballers
Namibia international footballers
Chief Santos players
Association football defenders
Namibia Premier League players
Black Africa S.C. players
F.C. Civics Windhoek players